Big Brother Second Life (BBSL) was a virtual version of Big Brother, produced by Endemol Netherlands in the virtual world of Second Life.

Fifteen Second Life contestants from three time zones were chosen to participate. The contest to become a contestant began on December 1, 2006. Contestants have to spend at least 8 hours a day in the transparent virtual Big Brother house for a total of one month, and completed various tasks such as building replicas of famous buildings. Their fate was decided by other Second Life residents, who voted on which contestants would be allowed to stay.

The Big Brother island, where residents applied to become contestants, contained five transparent residential units, and a Big Brother nightclub. During the course of the competition, several BB competitors kept online diaries of their participation. 

The contest ended on January 4, 2007, with the winner receiving their own virtual island. The winner was Madlen Flint.

Housemates 
The Fifteen Virtual Big Brother Participants were:

References

External links
Witnessing the Birth of an Entertainment Form - Big Brother in Second Life
TV Formats in Shared Spaces - The Build of Second Life Big Brother
Big Brother enters virtual world
Big Brother to debut in Second Life 
Endemol Brings Big Brother to Second Life

Big Brother (franchise)
Second Life
2006 Dutch television series debuts
2007 Dutch television series endings